John (Jock) Troup (26 May 1896 – 1954) was a well-known Christian evangelist from Fochabers, Scotland. He was the son of Harry Troup and Harriet Ross. He spent his youth as a cooper, and was part of the Territorial Force service.

Troup is best known for playing a large part in the Fisherman's Revival of 1921, known also as Jock Troup and the Fisherman's Revival. He preached all over Britain, looking to bring people to Christ, as described in Jackie Ritchie's book Floods Upon the Dry Ground (1983).

In 2001 Revival Man, The Jock Troup Story, a book by George Mitchell, was released about the preacher, followed by a film, Jock Troup and The Fisherman's Revival.

1896 births
1954 deaths
Year of death missing
Scottish evangelicals
Scottish evangelists
Christian revivalists